James Alexander, 4th Earl of Caledon,  (11 July 1846 – 27 April 1898), styled Viscount Alexander from birth until 1855, was a soldier and politician. He was the eldest son of James Du Pre Alexander, 3rd Earl of Caledon and his wife, Lady Jane Grimston.

He was born at his family's home in Carlton House Terrace, London, and educated at Harrow and Christ Church, Oxford. He succeeded to the title Earl of Caledon at the age of nine upon the death of his father in 1855.

Lord Caledon was elected to sit in the House of Lords as a Representative Peer for Ireland in 1877 and was Deputy Lieutenant of County Tyrone. He gained the rank of captain in the service of the 1st Life Guards, became a major serving with the 4th Battalion, Royal Inniskilling Fusiliers and fought in the Egyptian Campaign in 1882. He was also invested as a Knight of the Order of St Patrick on 14 November 1896.

He married Lady Elizabeth Graham-Toler, daughter of Hector Graham-Toler, 3rd Earl of Norbury, on 9 October 1884 and had 3 children:

Eric Alexander, 5th Earl of Caledon (9 August 1885 – 10 July 1968). He succeeded to the title but was unmarried, and died without children.
The Hon. Herbrand Charles Alexander (28 November 1888 – 6 May 1965), father of the 6th Earl.
The Hon. Harold Alexander, later Field Marshal the 1st Earl Alexander of Tunis (10 December 1891 – 16 June 1969). 
The Hon. William Sigismund Patrick Alexander (16 November 1895 – 24 December 1972). 

Lord Caledon died on 27 April 1898 at the age of 51 in Curzon Street, Mayfair, London, from blood poisoning and pneumonia. He was buried at Caledon, County Tyrone. Lady Caledon died on 6 October 1939.

References

1846 births
1898 deaths
Alumni of Christ Church, Oxford
British Army personnel of the Anglo-Egyptian War
British Life Guards officers
Deputy Lieutenants of Tyrone
Irish representative peers
Knights of St Patrick
People educated at Harrow School
People from Westminster
Royal Inniskilling Fusiliers officers
James
4
Deaths from blood disease
Deaths by poisoning
Deaths from pneumonia in England